Samuel Beatty  (1881–1970) was dean of the Faculty of Mathematics at the University of Toronto, taking the position in 1934.

Early life
Beatty was born in 1881. In 1915, he graduated from the University of Toronto with a PhD and a dissertation entitled Extensions of Results Concerning the Derivatives of an Algebraic Function of a Complex Variable, with the help of his adviser, John Charles Fields. He was the first person to receive a PhD in mathematics from a Canadian university. In 1925 he was elected a Fellow of the Royal Society of Canada. In 1926, he published a problem in the American Mathematical Monthly, which formed the genesis for the Beatty sequence.

University of Toronto
Beatty was dean of the Faculty of Mathematics at the University of Toronto, taking the position in 1934. The famous mathematician Richard Brauer was recruited by Beatty in 1935. He invited Harold Scott MacDonald Coxeter to the University of Toronto with a position as an assistant professor, which Coxeter took; he remained in Toronto for the rest of his life. In June 1939, he was one of the founding members of the Committee of Teaching Staff. Beatty was appointed the 21st Chancellor of the University of Toronto in 1953, holding the position until 1959. He was associated with the university from 1911 to 1952, and a scholarship was established in his honor. He died in 1970.

In an era when extremely few women received PhDs in mathematics, Beatty supervised the mathematical PhDs of Mary Fisher and Muriel Kennett Wales.

Nobel Prize in Chemistry winner Walter Kohn, a student at the university while Beatty was a dean, expressed his appreciation in 1998 to the dean when accepting the prize for his development of the density functional theory. In 1942, when Kohn could not access the university's chemistry buildings during World War II because of his German nationality, Beatty had helped him to enroll in the Mathematics Department at the University.

Canadian Mathematical Society
Beatty was one of the founders of the Canadian Mathematical Congress and was elected to serve as the first president of the congress in 1945. Under his presidency, the Canadian Mathematical Congress began to promote mathematical development in Canada. Beatty served as the president of the Canadian Mathematical Congress until 1978 at which point the congress was renamed the Canadian Mathematical Society to avoid further confusion with the quadrennial mathematical congresses.

References 

Overview of the Canadian Mathematical Society http://cms.math.ca/Docs/cms-eng.html

External links
 

Archival papers held by the University of Toronto Archives and Record Management Services.

1881 births
1970 deaths
Chancellors of the University of Toronto
Canadian university and college faculty deans
University of Toronto alumni
Canadian mathematicians
Fellows of the Royal Society of Canada
Presidents of the Canadian Mathematical Society